Samuel Braga is a Brazilian Jiu-Jitsu black belt and ten-time world champion. Samuel is a member of the Gracie Barra competition team and currently owns and runs an academy in Knoxville, Tennessee. There are several other affiliate schools of his in the surrounding area. Including, but not limited to, Leviathan Jiu-Jitsu, Maryville Jiu-Jitsu, and Seymour Brazilian Jiu Jitsu Academy.  He was awarded his black belt in 2005 by Vinicius "Draculino" Magalhães. He is a native of Belo Horizonte, Brazil.

References

Brazilian practitioners of Brazilian jiu-jitsu
Living people
1982 births
World No-Gi Brazilian Jiu-Jitsu Championship medalists
People awarded a black belt in Brazilian jiu-jitsu